The Sligo Wild Geese were an historical re-enactment group founded in 1993 in Sligo, Ireland. They were notable for many firsts, including their involvement in pioneering north–south co-operation during the beginning of the then fragile Irish peace process.

Introduction
Founded prior to the 1994 cease-fire by the IRA, the first re-enactment was staged mere weeks after the first cessation of hostilities.
 
It was originally formed to pioneer the concept of period re-enactment as a means of providing practical training and personal development for the long-term unemployed, whilst staging an event as a cultural and historical tourist attraction. The unit quickly found itself in the unique position of re-enacting an earlier stage of a war that was still ongoing. It became involved in cross-border initiatives due to the unique appeal to all sides in the Irish conflict.

Conscious of the old prophecy that "Ireland will lay at peace upon the return of the Wild Geese", they chose the 1688-1691 war in Ireland as their focus. This war saw Catholic and Protestant Irish fight on both sides for James II of England and William III of England. The Pope supported the Williamite side during the conflict.

Events
The Sligo Wild Geese staged the first large scale re-enactment in Ireland. This was the first event to use black powder weapons in Ireland. The importation and use of black powder, necessary to fire the cannon and muskets, was a security issue with the Irish State, but weeks before the event, the 1994 ceasefire was declared and the security climate improved enough to allow the staging of the event.

They were the first group of any sort from the Republic to stage an event in conjunction with the Apprentice Boys in Derry city.

Pioneered a new era in the St. Patricks Day parade in Sligo in 1999 in which Loyalist marching bands took part for the first time in history in celebrations south of the border.

The first group from the Republic to march down the Shankill road in Belfast.

They took part in the BBC documentary Warwalks in.

They were cited by politician John Hume as a rare example of successful cross border co-operation.

References

Historical reenactment groups